Capital College of Higher Education, is a college in Kohima, Nagaland. The college was established in 2004. It offers undergraduate courses in Arts and is affiliated to Nagaland University.

Departments

Arts
English
History
Political Science
Sociology
Education

Accreditation
The college is recognized by the University Grants Commission (UGC).

References

External links
Capital College of Higher Education Official Website

Colleges affiliated to Nagaland University
Universities and colleges in Nagaland
Educational institutions established in 2004
2004 establishments in Nagaland